This is a list of symphonies by Leif Segerstam.

List

Sources
 List of compositions by Leif Segerstam.

Lists of symphonies by composer
Lists of compositions by composer